John Erik Gunnar Friberg (born 10 February 1986) is a Swedish former professional footballer who played as a midfielder. Beginning his career with Västra Frölunda IF in 2005, he went on to represent Seattle Sounders, Malmö FF, Bologna, and Esbjerg fB before retiring at BK Häcken in 2022. He won two caps for the Sweden national team in 2012.

Club career

Early career
Friberg began his career with Västra Frölunda IF before moving to BK Häcken in January 2007. He made his UEFA Europa League debut on 2 August 2007 against KR Reykjavíkur. The game ended 0–1 for Häcken. He played 20 minutes in two games against Spartak Moscow during the first round of the UEFA Cup.

Seattle Sounders FC
On 16 December 2010, it was announced that Friberg had signed a deal with Seattle Sounders FC of Major League Soccer. He made his debut for the Sounders in their opening game of the 2011 MLS season against Los Angeles Galaxy.

Malmö FF
On 12 December 2011, Seattle Sounders confirmed that Friberg would move to Malmö FF for the 2012 season. Malmö FF announced the day after that Friberg had signed a contract until the end of the 2014 season. He joined Malmö FF when the transfer window opened on 1 January 2012. Friberg was applauded by media for his play during the 2012 pre-season. Friberg later played 24 out of 30 matches during his first season at the club.

For the club's league title winning 2013 season Friberg played 27 matches and scored 6 goals. He also played all six matches of the club's participation in the qualifying stages for the 2013–14 UEFA Europa League. During the season Friberg earned the nickname Mr. 100% after scoring six goals in six shots on goal during the entire season. His most important goal of the season was when he scored the only goal of the game at home against Mjällby AIF in the 26th round of the league with just a couple of minutes to go of the game.

Bologna
On 30 January 2014, Friberg signed with Italian Serie A club Bologna.

Return to Seattle Sounders
Friberg returned to Seattle Sounders FC on 29 June 2015.

Return to BK Häcken 
Friberg return to BK Häcken in 2017, and helped the club win the 2022 Allsvenskan title for the first time in the club's history before retiring at the end of the season.

International career
Friberg was selected for the annual training camp for the Sweden national team in January 2012 after Malmö teammates Mathias Ranégie and Ivo Pękalski had to withdraw from the squad. The squad selection for the camp traditionally feature the best Swedish players in domestic and other Scandinavian leagues. He made his debut for Sweden in the friendly against Bahrain on 18 January 2012, replacing Oscar Hiljemark in the 86th minute of a 2–0 win.

Personal life
He is the cousin of CS:GO player Adam Friberg.

Career statistics

Club

International
Appearances and goals by national team and year

Honours
Malmö FF
Allsvenskan: 2013
Svenska Supercupen: 2013

Seattle Sounders FC
MLS Cup: 2016
Lamar Hunt U.S. Open Cup: 2011

BK Häcken

 Allsvenskan: 2022
 Svenska Cupen: 2018–19

References

External links
 Malmö FF profile 
 
 

1986 births
Living people
Association football midfielders
Swedish footballers
Swedish expatriate footballers
Sweden international footballers
Västra Frölunda IF players
BK Häcken players
Seattle Sounders FC players
Malmö FF players
Bologna F.C. 1909 players
Esbjerg fB players
Expatriate soccer players in the United States
Expatriate footballers in Italy
Expatriate men's footballers in Denmark
Superettan players
Allsvenskan players
Major League Soccer players
Serie A players
Serie B players
Danish Superliga players
People from Mölndal Municipality
Sportspeople from Västra Götaland County